Joseph Oscar Loya (born June 12, 1979) is an American singer and Broadway musical theatre performer.

Biography 
Loya was born in 1979 in Indio, California and grew up as the youngest of five children in California. He is openly gay and lives in Munich, Germany.

Loya represented Germany at the final of the Eurovision Song Contest 2009 in Moscow, Russia together with Alex Christensen as Alex swings Oscar sings, performing the song "Miss Kiss Kiss Bang", with special guest Dita Von Teese performing with them in the Final. The song finished 20th in a final of 25 competing countries.

Loya released his debut album in 2009. His voice coach is Professor Dennis M. Heath (Munich). Heath teaches other successful professional artists in Europe, Australia, and the United States.

Loya concentrates on his solo career and released his second album "Beast" in 2011. "Beast" is a collaboration between Oscar and the electropop producer Alek Sandar. The self-written and co-produced single "Learn Something New" with Citrusonic Records has been published in December 2012.

From October 2012 to June 2013, Loya has been the principal character in the revue SHOW ME at the Friedrichstadt-Palast in Berlin.

Discography

Singles

Studio albums

References

External links 

 Official Website

1979 births
Living people
American emigrants to Germany
American male musical theatre actors
American gay musicians
German gay musicians
German pop singers
German LGBT singers
American LGBT singers
LGBT people from California
Eurovision Song Contest entrants for Germany
Eurovision Song Contest entrants of 2009
Entertainers from California
People from Indio, California
21st-century German male singers
20th-century American LGBT people
21st-century LGBT people